Davide Zanetti (Gardone Val Trompia, 14 March 1995) is an Italian rugby union player.
His usual position is as a Lock and he currently plays for Calvisano in Top12.

For 2016–17 Pro12 season, Zanetti was named as Additional Player for Zebre. 

In 2014 and 2015, he was also named in the Italy Under 20.

References

External links 
It's Rugby England Profile
Eurosport Profile

Sportspeople from the Province of Brescia
Italian rugby union players
1995 births
Living people
Rugby union locks
Rugby Calvisano players
Zebre Parma players